Godrej may refer to:
 Godrej family, a wealthy business family in India
Ardeshir Godrej (1868–1936)
Pirojsha Burjorji Godrej (1882–1972)
Adi Godrej (born 1942)
Nadir Godrej
Jamshyd Godrej
Pirojsha Adi Godrej
 Godrej Group, a group of companies founded by the Godrej family
Godrej & Boyce
 Godrej Consumer Products Limited
 Godrej Industries Ltd
 Godrej Infotech Ltd
 Godrej Properties Limited
Godrej Housing Finance Limited